Emily Murray Paterson RSW SWA (1855–1934) was a Scottish artist, connected with the Glasgow School and member of the Society of Women Artists.

Life and work

Emily Paterson was born in Edinburgh, Scotland in 1855. Her father, Duncan Wilkie Paterson SSC (1827-1911) was a solicitor from Ayrshire. He was a partner of Lindsay & Paterson at 24 Dublin Street in Edinburgh. Her mother was Anne Fleming Stephen (1827-1909).

Emily studied at the Edinburgh College of Art as well as in Paris and lived at Albyn Place, Edinburgh before moving to London in 1917. She travelled widely between 1909 and 1934. Shortly after the end of World War One, she visited the former battlefields at Ypres in Belgium. Her watercolours of ruined churches and other destroyed buildings from there, including views of the Ypres Cloth Hall, were shown in London in 1919. Paterson also visited the Netherlands and Italy on a number of occasions and was a keen Alpine walker, often making painting trips to both the Tyrol and Swiss Alps and exhibiting the resulting works at the Alpine Club in London. Her favoured subjects were landscapes, architecture and botany. She was elected member of the Royal Scottish Watercolour Society, Scottish Artists' Society and the Society of Women Artists.

Paterson died in London on 23 July 1934 - a memorial exhibition was held at Walker's Gallery, London later the same year.

She was returned to Edinburgh for burial with her parents in Dean Cemetery. The grave faces the small western entrance and is designed by Stewart McGlashan & Co.

Exhibitions

Paintings exhibited at the Royal Academy, London
1909 - The Giudecca, Venice
1910 - The Church, Dordrecht
1911 - Ponte del Canonica, Venice
1911 - Noon: St Mark's, Venice
1913 - Edge of the wood
1913 - The green ship, Venice
1914 - In Picardy
1914 - San Gregorio, Venice
1916 - Wengen: winter
1916 - Winter: Hyde Park
1918 - Bernese Oberland
1926 - The windmill on the Maas, Dordrecht
1927 - A bouquet
1928 - A bouquet of flower
1929 - Begonias
1930 - Roses
1934 - The Church, Dordrecht

Collections
Her work can be found in many public and private collections including the Imperial War Museum, Manchester Art Gallery, Brighton Museum & Art Gallery, Ulster Museum, Wolverhampton Art Gallery and the McLean Museum and Art Gallery.

References

External links

 

1855 births
1934 deaths
19th-century Scottish painters
20th-century Scottish painters
19th-century Scottish women artists
20th-century Scottish women artists
Artists from Edinburgh
Alumni of the Edinburgh College of Art
Landscape artists
Scottish watercolourists
Scottish women painters
Women watercolorists